Pinacopodium is a genus of flowering plants belonging to the family Erythroxylaceae.

Its native range is Western Central Tropical Africa.

Species:

Pinacopodium congolense 
Pinacopodium gabonense

References

Erythroxylaceae
Malpighiales genera